Ingunn Foss (born 7 February 1960) is a Norwegian politician for the Conservative Party.

She is Member of Parliament (Stortinget) for Vest-Agder County since 2013.

She served as a deputy representative to the Norwegian Parliament from Vest-Agder during the term 2005–2009.

On the local level she was the mayor of Lyngdal since 2007-2013. She was first elected to Lyngdal municipal council in 2003, and served as deputy mayor.

References

1960 births
Living people
Deputy members of the Storting
Members of the Storting
Conservative Party (Norway) politicians
Mayors of places in Vest-Agder
Women mayors of places in Norway
20th-century Norwegian women politicians
20th-century Norwegian politicians
21st-century Norwegian politicians
21st-century Norwegian women politicians
Women members of the Storting